Gordonstown is a name shared by two settlements in Aberdeenshire, Scotland:

 Gordonstown, Banff and Buchan, in Ordiquhill parish
 Gordonstown, Formartine, in Auchterless parish